Richard Boxall (born 28 April 1961) is an English professional golfer.

Golf career
Boxall turned professional in 1982 and won a place on the European Tour at that year's final qualifying school. He played on the Tour until 2000, and won one Tour event, the 1990 Lancia Martini Italian Open. He also had his best finish on the Order of Merit that year, placing seventeenth. He represented England in the Alfred Dunhill Cup and the World Cup of Golf in 1990.

During the third round of The Open Championship at Royal Birkdale in 1991, Boxall was just two strokes off the lead when he suffered a stress fracture of his left leg while playing his tee shot on the ninth hole.

Media work
Boxall now works as a golf commentator, mainly on Sky Sports coverage of the European Tour.

He started on the BBC.

Professional wins (2)

European Tour wins (1)

European Tour playoff record (0–1)

Other wins (1)
1995 J. P. McManus Pro-Am (shared title with Paul Broadhurst)

Results in major championships

Note: Boxall only played in The Open Championship.

CUT = missed the half-way cut
WD = withdrew
"T" = tied

Team appearances
Amateur
European Youths' Team Championship (representing England): 1982,
Professional
Dunhill Cup (representing England): 1990
World Cup (representing England): 1990

References

External links

English male golfers
European Tour golfers
Golf writers and broadcasters
Sky Sports presenters and reporters
People from the London Borough of Richmond upon Thames
People from Camberley
1961 births
Living people